Clostridium collagenovorans is a bacterium from the genus Clostridium which has been isolated from sewage sludge in the United States.

References

Further reading
 

 

Bacteria described in 1988
collagenovorans